Joseph Hammond may refer to:
 Joseph Ashitey Hammond, Ghanaian veteran and fundraiser during the COVID-19 pandemic
 Joseph Joel Hammond, New Zealand aviator
 Joe Hammond, Australian rules footballer 
 Joe Hammond (basketball), streetball basketball player
 Joey Hammond, American baseball coach and player